Aliaksandr Voranau (born 15 March 1990) is a Belarusian cross-country skier. He competed in the 2018 Winter Olympics.

References

1990 births
Living people
Cross-country skiers at the 2018 Winter Olympics
Cross-country skiers at the 2022 Winter Olympics
Belarusian male cross-country skiers
Olympic cross-country skiers of Belarus
People from Mogilev
Sportspeople from Mogilev Region